Parafomoria helianthemella is a moth of the family Nepticulidae. It is found in central and southern Europe, including Germany, south-eastern Poland, the Czech Republic, Slovakia, Hungary, Austria, Switzerland, northern Italy, France (the Alps and Pyrenees) and Bulgaria.

The length of the forewings is 1.7–2 mm for males and 1.6-2.2 mm for females. Adults are on wing from March to April (occasionally May), in July and from August to September. There are three generations per year in Hungary.

The larvae feed on Helianthemum canum, Helianthemum nummularium, Helianthemum oelandicum alpestre and Helianthemum oelandicum incanum and Helianthemum salicifolium. They mine the leaves of their host plant. The mine consists of a narrow corridor, often following the leaf margin or a vein. The frass is deposited in a relatively thick central line, continuous at first, dispersed towards the end.

External links
Fauna Europaea
bladmineerders.nl
The Cistaceae-feeding Nepticulidae (Lepidoptera) of the western Palaearctic region

Nepticulidae
Moths of Europe
Moths described in 1860